Williamston Colored School, also known as E. J. Hayes School and E. J. Hayes High School, is a historic Rosenwald School building located at Williamston, Martin County, North Carolina, USA. It was built between 1930 and 1931 and is a one-story, five-bay, "H"-shaped, Colonial Revival style red brick building. It has two projecting pedimented gable-front wings, a hipped roof, and large decorative brick panels in a basketweave bond. A three classroom addition was built in 1939.

It was listed on the National Register of Historic Places in 2014.

References

African-American history of North Carolina
Rosenwald schools in North Carolina
School buildings on the National Register of Historic Places in North Carolina
Colonial Revival architecture in North Carolina
School buildings completed in 1931
Buildings and structures in Martin County, North Carolina
National Register of Historic Places in Martin County, North Carolina